Evelin Száraz (born 21 August 2005) is a Hungarian Paralympic swimmer. She was a bronze medalist at the 2019 World Para Swimming Championships in London.

References

2005 births
Living people
Swimmers from Budapest
Hungarian female breaststroke swimmers
Paralympic swimmers of Hungary
Medalists at the World Para Swimming Championships
S6-classified Paralympic swimmers